János Becsey (born 2 February 1968) is a retired Hungarian Paralympic swimmer. He competed at the Paralympic Games six times and won five medals, including two golds at the 1992 Summer Paralympics in Barcelona. In addition, he is also a four-time World Championships gold medalist. 

He was inspired to start swimming after watching the 1976 Summer Olympics, when he was only eight years old, and began training at age of 6.

Becsey has cerebral paresis on his right side due to oxygen deprivation and a stroke when he was an infant.

References

1968 births
Living people
Swimmers from Budapest
Paralympic swimmers of Hungary
Swimmers at the 1988 Summer Paralympics
Swimmers at the 1992 Summer Paralympics
Swimmers at the 1996 Summer Paralympics
Swimmers at the 2000 Summer Paralympics
Swimmers at the 2004 Summer Paralympics
Swimmers at the 2008 Summer Paralympics
Medalists at the 1988 Summer Paralympics
Medalists at the 1992 Summer Paralympics
Medalists at the 2000 Summer Paralympics
Medalists at the World Para Swimming Championships
Hungarian male freestyle swimmers
S7-classified Paralympic swimmers